Trouble Makers is a lost 1917 silent film drama directed by Kenean Buel, and starring sisters Jane and Katherine Lee. It was produced and distributed by Fox Film Corporation.

Cast
Lillian Concord - Mrs. Lehr
Jane Lee - Jane
Katherine Lee - Katherine
Richard Turner - Daniel Whitcomb
Robert Vivian - Job Jenkins
William T. Hayes - Isaac White
Stuart Sage - "Manny"
Frances Miller - Cynthia

See also
1937 Fox vault fire

References

External links
 Trouble Makers at IMDb.com

1917 films
American silent feature films
Lost American films
Fox Film films
Films directed by Kenean Buel
American black-and-white films
Silent American drama films
1917 drama films
1917 lost films
Lost drama films
1910s American films